Dion Joseph Ignacio (born March 28, 1986) is a Filipino actor and musician. Popularly known of his role as Raul Agoncillo in the afternoon soap opera Saan Darating Ang Umaga, a role originally portrayed by former 1980s teen idol Raymond Lauchengco, but his most notable role in TV is in the afternoon drama Magdalena, where he is paired with Bela Padilla.

Ignacio is also the rhythm guitarist of the rock band Philia with Arci Muñoz as their lead vocalist.

Biography
Ignacio entered Philippine show business after joining StarStruck. He is one of the StarStruck Avengers. Though he wasn't to bag the Ultimate Survivor title, Ignacio shows off his guitar skills as the bassist of the All Star Band, and with a movie together with TV guestings. He played various roles like playing a villain, leading man or supporting character in various shows. Ignacio was also a member of Studs, an all-male group.

Career
As of 2008, his biggest break is playing a leading man to Yasmien Kurdi in Sine Novela, Saan Darating Ang Umaga?. He is now immortalizing a role originally portrayed by Rustom Padilla (now known as BB Gandanghari) in the new Sine Novela Ngayon at Kailanman. Ignacio joined the cast of My Lover, My Wife in 2011 co-starring Maxene Magalona and Nadine Samonte.

As a musician
Ignacio is formerly a part of Filipino hard rock band Philia as rhythm guitarist.

Filmography

Television

Film

Awards and nominations

References

External links

Dion Ignacio's profile in iGMA.TV
https://www.gmanetwork.com/sparkle/artists/dion_ignacio
Dion Ignacio at PogiSpotting

1986 births
Living people
Filipino male child actors
Filipino male television actors
Filipino male models
Male actors from Laguna (province)
Tagalog people
Participants in Philippine reality television series
StarStruck (Philippine TV series) participants
GMA Network personalities
Filipino male film actors